Dasa refers to a devotee, surname, tribe, enemy, or servant in Sanskrit.

Dasa or DASA may also refer to:

 DASA, also known as Deutsche Aerospace, Daimler-Benz Aerospace and DaimlerChrysler Aerospace, a former German aircraft manufacturer
 Dasà, a town in Italy
 Defence Analytical Services and Advice, part of the British  Ministry of Defence
 Defence and Security Accelerator, competitive portal for Dstl, part of the British  Ministry of Defence
 Diagnosticos da America S.A., a Brazilian company
 Dasa-eup, a town in Daegu, South Korea
 DevOps Agile Skills Association, an association supporting the development of IT organizations through agile & DevOps initiatives
 Doclean Academy of Sciences and Arts, an academic institution in Montenegro
 Dignity for All Students Act, a New York State law against discrimination and harassment in public educational settings